Akihiro (written: , , , , , , , , 明広,  or ) is a masculine Japanese given name. Notable people with the name include:

, Japanese footballer
, Japanese volleyball player
, Japanese mixed martial artist
Akihiro Higuchi, Ukrainian-born film director known by his alias Higuchinsky
, Japanese video game designer and businessman
, Japanese footballer
, Japanese footballer
, Japanese-born American mathematician
, Japanese artistic gymnast
, Japanese actor and director
, Japanese artist
, Japanese daimyō
, Japanese singer, drag queen, director, composer and writer
, Japanese shogi player
, Japanese mixed martial artist
, Japanese footballer
, Japanese politician
, Japanese footballer and manager
, Japanese footballer
, Japanese sport shooter
, Japanese footballer
, Japanese footballer
Akihiro Sato (model), Brazilian model
, Japanese biathlete
Akihiro Tsukiyama, birth name of Lee Myung-Bak, President of South Korea
, Japanese illustrator and manga artist
, Japanese swimmer
, Japanese volleyball player
, Japanese baseball player
, Japanese baseball player
, Japanese footballer

Fictional characters
Akihiro Kurata, a character in the anime series Digimon Data Squad
Akihiro, also named Daken, a character in Marvel Comics

See also
5355 Akihiro, a main-belt asteroid

Japanese masculine given names